Zidani may refer to:

Marcel Zidani, British pianist and composer
Zidani clan, Arab family that ruled Palestine in the 18th century
Zidani Most, a Slovenian village of the municipality of Laško
Zidani Most railway station
Zidani Most, Trebnje, a Slovenian village of the municipality of Trebnje
 Zaydan, a name of Arab origin, meaning increase (z.y.d root)

See also
Zidan (disambiguation)
Zidane (name), disambiguation page